Maggie Lau is a Hong Kong actress and singer. She starred in New Police Story, The Twins Effect and also had a small acting part in The Myth alongside Jackie Chan and Korean actress, Kim Hee-sun.

She has had a minor musical career as a member of the now dissolved girl group 3T. In 2004, she sang in the song "Girls" together with Boy'Z and also appeared in the music video.

External links
 

1982 births
Living people
Cantopop singers
Hong Kong film actresses
Hong Kong Mandopop singers
Hong Kong television actresses
21st-century Hong Kong women singers